Grant Kirkhope is a Scottish-American composer and voice actor for video games and film. Some of his notable works include GoldenEye 007, Banjo-Kazooie, Donkey Kong 64, and Perfect Dark, among many others. He has been nominated for various BAFTA, ASCAP, and IFMCA awards.

Early life and education
Kirkhope was born in Edinburgh, Scotland, where his mother worked as a music hall dancer. Kirkhope's father was an avid music fan and exposed him to early influences such as Frank Sinatra and Glenn Miller. Kirkhope taught himself to play guitar at age 11 and is classically trained in the trumpet. Kirkhope was brought up in Knaresborough, North Yorkshire from the age of five, and attended King James's School. Kirkhope played in various bands after leaving the Royal Northern College of Music, including Zoot and the Roots along with the saxophonist Snake Davis. Kirkhope also spent many years as part of "the Big Bad Horns" which were part of UK rock band Little Angels. Kirkhope joined Rare in October 1995, he played for two bands called Syar and Maineeaxe where he played the guitar and already knew Robin Beanland, another Rare composer.

Career
Kirkhope is a BAFTA, ASCAP and IFMCA-nominated composer who has created the soundtrack for various video games. Kirkhope's score for Viva Piñata was nominated by BAFTA in the Original Score category in its 2007 awards.

Kingdoms of Amalur: Reckoning was nominated for Best Score for a Video Game or Interactive Media by the International Film Music Critics Association and in the Cue Awards 2012 for Best Overall Score, Best Video Game Score and Grant was also nominated for Best Break Out Composer.

Kirkhope was nominated in the 2015 ASCAP Composer’s Choice Awards for his work on “Civilization: Beyond Earth” and also won the Best Original Score for a Video Game or Interactive Media 2015 from the International Film Music Critics Association for the same score. Civilization: Beyond Earth also won Best Score: Video Game at the Cue Awards 2015. He was nominated in the 2016 ASCAP Composer’s Choice Awards for his work on Civilization: Beyond Earth – Rising Tide and was also nominated for Best Original Score for a Video Game or Interactive Media 2016 from the International Film Music Critics Association for the same score. Civilization: Beyond Earth – Rising Tide was also nominated for Best Score: Video Game at the Cue Awards 2016.

He won the award for Best Score at the Silicon Beach Film Festival for the score to the feature film "Shadows" directed by Michael Matteo Rossi in 2020. The score to the animated short "The Wrong Rock" was nominated for Original Score - Short Film (animation) at the Hollywood Media in Music awards in 2021. The score to the feature film "The King's Daughter" won the People's Vote Award at the World Soundtrack Awards in 2022. The score for "Mario + Rabbids Sparks of Hope" was nominated for Score - Video Game and the score for "The King's Daughter" was nominated for Score - Fantasy Film at the Hollywood Music and Media Awards in 2022.

Personal life
Kirkhope moved to the United States to work on Kingdoms of Amalur: Reckoning and became a naturalized United States citizen in March 2017. As of 2017, he and his family reside in southern California.

Work

Games

Film

Voice acting

Kirkhope was also involved in casting the voice actors for the Viva Piñata cartoon.

References

External links
 
 
 

20th-century British composers
20th-century British male musicians
20th-century trumpeters
21st-century British composers
21st-century British male musicians
21st-century trumpeters
American people of Scottish descent
British expatriates in the United States
British rock keyboardists
British male composers
British male guitarists
British rock trumpeters
British jazz trumpeters
Freelance musicians
Living people
Male trumpeters
Musicians from Edinburgh
Rare (company) people
Nintendo people
Video game composers
Zoot and the Roots members
1962 births